The Boeing 727 is an American narrow-body airliner that was developed and produced by Boeing Commercial Airplanes.

After the heavy 707 quad-jet was introduced in 1958, Boeing addressed the demand for shorter flight lengths from smaller airports.
On December 5, 1960, the 727 was launched with 40 orders each from United Airlines and Eastern Air Lines.
The first 727-100 rolled out on November 27, 1962, first flew on February 9, 1963, and entered service with Eastern on February 1, 1964.

The only trijet aircraft to be produced by Boeing, the 727 is powered by Pratt & Whitney JT8D low-bypass turbofans below a T-tail, one on each side of the rear fuselage and a center one fed through an S-duct.
It shares its six-abreast upper fuselage cross-section and cockpit with the 707.

Launched in 1965, the stretched 727-200 flew in July 1967 and entered service with Northeast Airlines that December.
Besides the airliner accommodation, a freighter and a Quick Change convertible version were offered.

The 727 was used for many domestic flights and on many international flights within its range.
Airport noise regulations have led to hush kit installations. 
Its last commercial passenger flight was in January 2019.
It was succeeded by the 757-200 and larger variants of the 737.

, a total of 38 Boeing 727s were in commercial service.

There have been 118 fatal incidents involving the Boeing 727.

Production ended in September 1984 with 1,832 having been built.

Development

The Boeing 727 design was a compromise among United Airlines, American Airlines, and Eastern Air Lines; each of the three had developed requirements for a jet airliner to serve smaller cities with shorter runways and fewer passengers. United Airlines requested a four-engine aircraft for its flights to high-altitude airports, especially its hub at Stapleton International Airport in Denver, Colorado. American Airlines, which was operating the four-enginedd Boeing 707 and Boeing 720, requested a twin-engined aircraft for efficiency. Eastern Airlines wanted a third engine for its overwater flights to the Caribbean, since at that time twin-engine commercial flights were limited by regulations to routes with 60-minute maximum flying time to an airport (see ETOPS). Eventually, the three airlines agreed on a trijet design for the new aircraft.

In 1959, Lord Douglas, chairman of British European Airways (BEA), suggested that Boeing and de Havilland Aircraft Company (later Hawker Siddeley) work together on their trijet designs, the 727 and D.H.121 Trident, respectively. The two designs had a similar layout, the 727 being slightly larger. At that time Boeing intended to use three Allison AR963 turbofan engines, license-built versions of the Rolls-Royce RB163 Spey used by the Trident. Boeing and de Havilland each sent engineers to the other company's locations to evaluate each other's designs, but Boeing eventually decided against the joint venture.

In 1960, Pratt & Whitney was looking for a customer for its new JT8D turbofan design study, based on its J52 (JT8A) turbojet, while United and Eastern were interested in a Pratt & Whitney alternative to the RB163 Spey. Once Pratt & Whitney agreed to go ahead with development of the JT8D, Eddie Rickenbacker, chairman of the board of Eastern, told Boeing that the airline preferred the JT8D for its 727s. Boeing had not offered the JT8D, as it was about  heavier than the RB163, though slightly more powerful; the RB163 was also further along in development than the JT8D. Boeing reluctantly agreed to offer the JT8D as an option on the 727, and it later became the sole powerplant.

With high-lift devices on its wing, the 727 could use shorter runways than most earlier jets (e.g. the 4800-ft runway at Key West International Airport).

Later 727 models were stretched to carry more passengers and replaced earlier jet airliners such as the Boeing 707 and Douglas DC-8, as well as aging propeller airliners such as the DC-4, DC-6, DC-7, and the Lockheed Constellations on short- and medium-haul routes.

For over a decade, more 727s were built per year than any other jet airliner; in 1984, production ended with 1,832 built and 1,831 delivered, the highest total for any jet airliner until the 737 surpassed it in the early 1990s.

Design

The airliner's middle engine (engine 2) at the very rear of the fuselage gets air from an inlet ahead of the vertical fin through an S-shaped duct. This S-duct proved to be troublesome in that flow distortion in the duct induced a surge in the centerline engine on the take-off of the first flight of the 727-100. This was fixed by the addition of several large vortex generators in the inside of the first bend of the duct.

The 727 was designed for smaller airports, so independence from ground facilities was an important requirement. This led to one of the 727's most distinctive features: the built-in airstair that opens from the rear underbelly of the fuselage, which initially could be opened in flight. Hijacker D. B. Cooper used this hatch when he parachuted from the back of a 727, as it was flying over the Pacific Northwest. Boeing subsequently modified the design with the Cooper vane so that the airstair could not be lowered in flight. The design included an auxiliary power unit (APU), which allowed electrical and air-conditioning systems to run independently of a ground-based power supply, and without having to start one of the main engines. An unusual design feature is that the APU is mounted in a hole in the keel beam web, in the main landing gear bay. The 727 is equipped with a retractable tailskid that is designed to protect the aircraft in the event of an over-rotation on takeoff. An unusual feature of the fuselage is the  difference between the lower lobe forward and aft of the wing as the higher fuselage height of the center section was simply retained towards the rear.

The 727 proved to be such a reliable and versatile airliner that it came to form the core of many startup airlines' fleets. The 727 was successful with airlines worldwide partly because it could use smaller runways while still flying medium-range routes. This allowed airlines to carry passengers from cities with large populations, but smaller airports to worldwide tourist destinations. One of the features that gave the 727 its ability to land on shorter runways was its clean wing design. With no wing-mounted engines, leading-edge devices (Krueger, or hinged, flaps on the inner wing and extendable leading edge slats out to the wingtip) and trailing-edge lift enhancement equipment (triple-slotted, fowler flaps) could be used on the entire wing. Together, these high-lift devices produced a maximum wing lift coefficient of 3.0 (based on the flap-retracted wing area). The 727 was stable at very low speeds compared to other early jets, but some domestic carriers learned after review of various accidents that the 40-degree flap setting could result in a higher-than-desired sink rate or a stall on final approach. These carriers' Pilots' Operation Handbooks disallowed using more than 30° of flaps on the 727, even going so far as installing plates on the flap lever slot to prevent selection of more than 30° of flaps.

Noise

The 727 is one of the noisiest commercial jetliners, categorized as Stage 2 by the U.S. Noise Control Act of 1972, which mandated the gradual introduction of quieter Stage 3 aircraft. The 727's JT8D jet engines use older low-bypass turbofan technology, whereas Stage 3 aircraft use the more efficient and quieter high-bypass turbofan design. When the Stage 3 requirement was being proposed, Boeing engineers analyzed the possibility of incorporating quieter engines on the 727. They determined that the JT8D-200 engine could be used on the two side-mounted pylons.

Current regulations require that a 727, or any other Stage 2 noise jetliner in commercial service must be retrofitted with a hush kit to reduce engine noise to Stage 3 levels to continue to fly in U.S airspace. These regulations have been in effect since December 31, 1999. One such hush kit is offered by FedEx, and has been purchased by over 60 customers. Aftermarket winglet kits, originally developed by Valsan Partners and later marketed by Quiet Wing Corp. have been installed on many 727s to reduce noise at lower speeds, as well as to reduce fuel consumption. In addition, Raisbeck Engineering developed packages to enable 727s to meet the Stage 3 noise requirements. These packages managed to get light- and medium-weight 727s to meet Stage 3 with simple changes to the flap and slat schedules. For heavier-weight 727s, exhaust mixers must be added to meet Stage 3. American Airlines ordered and took delivery of 52 Raisbeck 727 Stage 3 systems. Other customers included TWA, Pan Am, Air Algérie, TAME, and many smaller airlines.

Since September 1, 2010, 727 jetliners (including those with a hush kit) are banned from some Australian airports because they are too loud.

Operational history

In addition to domestic flights of medium range, the 727 was popular with international passenger airlines. The range of flights it could cover (and the additional safety added by the third engine) meant that the 727 proved efficient for short- to medium-range international flights in areas around the world.

The 727 also proved popular with cargo and charter airlines. FedEx Express introduced 727s in 1978. The 727s were the backbone of its fleet until the 2000s; FedEx began replacing them with Boeing 757s in 2007. Many cargo airlines worldwide employ the 727 as a workhorse, since, as it is being phased out of U.S. domestic service because of noise regulations, it becomes available to overseas users in areas where such noise regulations have not yet been instituted. Charter airlines Sun Country, Champion Air, and Ryan International Airlines all started with 727 aircraft.

The 727 had some military uses, as well. Since the aft stair could be opened in flight, the Central Intelligence Agency used them to drop agents and supplies behind enemy lines in Vietnam. In early 1988, The Iraqi Air Force modified a Boeing 727 by fitting it with Thomson-CSF TMV-018 Syrel pods for ESM and Raphael-TH pods with side looking radar. Known as 'Faw-727', it was reportedly used as an ELINT platform in the Invasion of Kuwait in 1990 (during which it was briefly locked on by a Kuwaiti Mirage F1 on August 2) and the subsequent Iraqi monitoring of Coalition forces during Desert Shield.

The 727 has proven to be popular where the airline serves airports with gravel, or otherwise lightly improved, runways. The Canadian airline First Air, for example, previously used a 727-100C to serve the communities of Resolute Bay and Arctic Bay in Nunavut, whose Resolute Bay Airport and former Nanisivik Airport both have gravel runways. The high-mounted engines greatly reduce the risk of foreign object damage.

A military version, the Boeing C-22, was operated as a medium-range transport aircraft by the Air National Guard and National Guard Bureau to airlift personnel. A total of three C-22Bs were in use, all assigned to the 201st Airlift Squadron, District of Columbia Air National Guard.

At the start of the 21st century, the 727 remained in service with a few large airlines. Faced with higher fuel costs, lower passenger volumes due to the post-9/11 economic climate, increasing restrictions on airport noise, and the extra expenses of maintaining older planes and paying flight engineers' salaries, most major airlines phased out their 727s; they were replaced by twin-engined aircraft, which are quieter and more fuel-efficient. Modern airliners also have a smaller flight deck crew of two pilots, while the 727 required two pilots and a flight engineer. Delta Air Lines, the last major U.S. carrier to do so, retired its last 727 from scheduled service in April 2003. Northwest Airlines retired its last 727 from charter service in June 2003. Many airlines replaced their 727s with either the 737-800 or the Airbus A320; both are close in size to the 727-200. , a total of 109 Boeing 727s were in commercial service with 34 airlines; three years later, the total had fallen to 64 airframes in service with 26 airlines.

On March 2, 2016, the first 727 produced (N7001U), which first flew on February 9, 1963, made a flight to a museum after extensive restoration. The 727-100 had carried about three million passengers during its years of service. Originally a prototype, it was later sold to United Airlines, which donated it to the Museum of Flight in Seattle in 1991. The jet was restored over 25 years by the museum and was ferried from Paine Field in Everett, Washington to Boeing Field in Seattle, where it was put on permanent display at the Aviation Pavilion. The Federal Aviation Administration granted the museum a special permit for the 15-minute flight. The museum's previous 727-223, tail number N874AA, was donated to the National Airline History Museum in Kansas City and was planned to be flown to its new home once FAA ferry approval was granted. After a series of financial problems with the restoration, N874AA was seized by Boeing Field for nonpayment of storage fees in 2021 and subsequently broken up and scrapped.

On January 13, 2019, the last commercial passenger flight of a Boeing 727 was flown between Zahedan and Tehran by Iran Aseman Airlines.

Variants

Data from: Boeing Aircraft since 1916The two series of 727 are the initial -100 (originally only two figures as in -30), which was launched in 1960 and entered service in February 1964, and the -200 series, which was launched in 1965 and entered service in December 1967.

727-100

The first 727-100 (N7001U) flew on February 9, 1963. FAA type approval was awarded on December 24 of that year, with initial delivery to United Airlines on October 29, 1963, to allow pilot training to commence. The first  service was flown by Eastern Air Lines on February 1, 1964, between Miami, Washington, DC, and Philadelphia.

A total of 571 Boeing 727-00/100 series aircraft were delivered (407 -100s, 53 -100Cs, and 111 -100QCs), the last in October 1972. One 727-100 was retained by Boeing, bringing total production to 572.

The -100 designation was assigned retroactively to distinguish the original short-body version. Actual aircraft followed a "727-00" pattern. Aircraft were delivered for United Airlines as 727-22, for American Airlines as 727-23, and so on (not -122, -123, etc.) and these designations were retained even after the advent of the 727-200.

727-100C
Convertible passenger cargo version, additional freight door and strengthened floor and floor beams, three alternative fits:
94 mixed-class passengers
52 mixed-class passengers and four cargo pallets
Eight cargo pallets

727-100QC
QC stands for Quick Change. This is similar to the convertible version with a roller-bearing floor for palletised galley and seating and/or cargo to allow much faster changeover time (30 minutes).

727-100QF
QF stands for Quiet Freighter. A cargo conversion for United Parcel Service, these were re-engined with Stage 3-compliant Rolls-Royce Tay turbofans.

Boeing C-22A
A single 727-30 acquired from the Federal Aviation Administration, this aircraft was originally delivered to Lufthansa. It served mostly with United States Southern Command flying from Panama City / Howard Air Force Base.

Boeing C-22B
Four 727-35 aircraft were acquired from National Airlines by the United States Air Force for transporting Air National Guard and National Guard personnel.

727-200

A stretched version of the 727-100, the -200 is  longer than the -100. A 10-ft (3-m) fuselage section ("plug") was added in front of the wings and another 10-ft fuselage section was added behind them. The wing span and height remain the same on both the -100 and -200 (respectively). The original 727-200 had the same maximum gross weight as the 727-100; however, as the aircraft evolved, a series of higher gross weights and more powerful engines were introduced along with other improvements, and from line number 881, 727-200s are dubbed -200 Advanced. The dorsal intake of the number-two engine was also redesigned to be round in shape, rather than oval as it was on the -100 series.

The first 727-200 flew on July 27, 1967, and received FAA certification on November 30, 1967. The first delivery was made on December 14, 1967, to Northeast Airlines. A total of 310 727-200s were delivered before the -200 was replaced on the production line by the 727-200 Advanced in 1972.

727-200C
A convertible passenger cargo version; only one was built.

727-200 Advanced 
The Advanced version of the 727-200 was introduced in 1970. After the first delivery in mid-1972, Boeing eventually raised production to more than a hundred per year to meet demand by the late 1970s. Of the passenger model of the 727-200 Advanced, a total of 935 were delivered, after which it had to give way to a new generation of aircraft.

727-200F Advanced
A freighter version of the 727-200 Advanced became available in 1981, designated the Series 200F Advanced. Fifteen of these aircraft were built, all for Federal Express. This was the last production variant of the 727 to be developed by Boeing; the last 727 aircraft completed by Boeing was a 727-200F Advanced.

Super 27
Certificated by Valsan Partners in December 1988 and marketed by Goodrich from 1997, the side engines are replaced by more efficient, quieter JT8D-217C/219, and the center engine gains a hush kit for $8.6 million (but loses the thrust reverser) (2000): fuel consumption is reduced by 10-12%, range and restricted airfield performance are improved.

Boeing C-22C
A single 727-212 aircraft was operated by the USAF.

Proposed
727-300
A proposed 169-seat version was developed in consultation with United Airlines in 1972, which initially expressed an interest in ordering 50 aircraft. Also, interest was shown from Indian Airlines for a one-class version with 180 seats. The three engines would have been replaced by two more powerful JT8D-217 engines under the T tail. Many cockpit components would have been common with 737-200 and improved engine management systems would have eliminated the need for the flight engineer. United did not proceed with its order and Indian Airlines instead ordered the larger Airbus A300, so the project was cancelled in 1976.

727-400
A concept with a  fuselage and two high-bypass turbofan engines under the wings (but retaining the T tail) was proposed in 1977. More compact systems, a redesign of the internal space, and removing the need for the flight engineer would have increased the capacity to 189 seats in a two-class configuration. After only a few months, the concept was developed into the Boeing 7N7 design, which eventually became the Boeing 757.

 Other variants 
Faw-727

This Boeing 727 was reportedly modified by Iraq in early 1988 to serve as an ELINT platform. It was used during the invasion of Kuwait and Operation Desert Shield. 

Operators

Commercial operators

,  35 Boeing 727s were in commercial service. Iran Aseman Airlines, the last passenger airline operator, made the last scheduled 727 passenger flight on 13 January 2019. These operators have three or more aircraft for cargo as of July 2022:

Total Linhas Aereas (5)
Kalitta Charters (3)
Aerosucre (3)

T2 Aviation Ltd uses two modified former FedEx 727-200 freighters, operated by 2 Excel Aviation, equipped with oil-dispersal tanks and spray booms to respond to oil spills.

Zero Gravity Corporation uses a modified 727-200 in reduced-gravity passenger-carrying operations.

Uruguayan cargo carrier Air Class Cargo SA (http://www.airclasscargo.com/) uses two 727-200s, active registration numbers CX-CLC and CX-CAR.

USA Jet Airlines of Willow Run, MI (KYIP), operates two Ex-Capital Cargo Boeing 727-200 freighters on ad hoc cargo operations.

Government, military, and other operators

In addition, the 727 has seen sporadic government use, having flown for the Belgian, Yugoslav, Mexican, New Zealand, and Panama air forces, along with a small group of government agencies that have used it.

 Private aircraft 
A number of 727s have been outfitted for use as private aircraft, especially since the early 1990s, when major airlines began to eliminate older 727-100 models from their fleet. Donald Trump traveled in a former American Airlines 727-100 with a dining room, a bedroom, and shower facilities known as Trump Force One before upgrading to a larger Boeing 757 in 2009; Peter Nygård acquired a 727-100 for private use in 2005. American financier Jeffrey Epstein owned a private 727 nicknamed the "Lolita Express". The Gettys bought N311AG from Revlon in 1986, and Gordon Getty acquired the aircraft in 2001.

Accidents and incidents

, a total of 351 incidents involving 727s had occurred, including 119 hull-loss accidents resulting in a total of 4,211 fatalities.

Orders and deliveries

Source: Data from Boeing, through the end of production

Boeing 727 orders and deliveries (cumulative, by year):

 

Model summary

Source: Boeing

Aircraft on display
A comparatively large number of surviving retired 727s remain, largely as a result of donation by FedEx of 84 of them to various institutions. The vast majority of the aircraft was given to university aviation maintenance programs. All but five are located within the United States.

 N7001U – 727-022 is on static display at the Museum of Flight in Seattle, Washington. It was the first 727 completed. It departed from Paine Field in Everett, Washington, and landed at the museum on March 2, 2016.
N7004U – 727-022 is in storage at the Pima Air & Space Museum in Tucson, Arizona. It was the first 727 delivered to a customer and the first to make a commercial flight. It is currently awaiting restoration.
 N7017U – 727 is on static display at the Museum of Science and Industry in Chicago, Illinois. It was donated by United Airlines. It features cutaway sections showing airplane framework and lavatory, cockpit view, and a few rows of seating.
 N186FE – 727-100 is on static display at Owens Community College in Perrysburg, Ohio. It formerly was operated by FedEx and donated by the company in 2007.
 N199FE – 727-173C is on static display at the Kansas Aviation Museum in Wichita, Kansas. It was formerly operated by FedEx as N199FE.
 N113FE Jarrod – 727-022C is in storage at the National Museum of Commercial Aviation in Atlanta, Georgia. It was formerly operated by FedEx as N113FE, and by United Airlines before that as N7437U.
 N265SE Paul – 727-200 is on static display at the Florida Air Museum in Lakeland, Florida. It was formerly operated by FedEx.
 N492FE Two Bears – 727-227 is on static display with the University of Alaska at Merrill Field in Anchorage, Alaska. It was formerly operated by FedEx and was donated by the company on February 26, 2013.
 N874AA – 727-223 was previously on display at the Museum of Flight and later stored for the Airline History Museum at Boeing Field in Seattle. The aircraft was eventually seized by King County (Washington) for nonpayment of rent and storage fees, declared nonairworthy, and scrapped at Boeing Field in November 2021.
 G-BNNI Lady Patricia'' 727-276 was last flown by Sabre Airways in 2000. Purchased by 727 Communications, an advertising company in Skanderborg, Denmark, it now serves as a conference room and billboard at their offices.
 VP-CMN "PYTCHAir" - 727-46 is located in Bristol, UK, and was purchased by technology investor Johnny Palmer for his media company PYTCH.   The fuselage is resting atop a series of shipping containers and was transported in February 2021.
 XA-RRA – 727-14 is preserved in Mexicana de Aviación livery at Parque Metropolitano in León, Guanajuato, Mexico.
 XC-FPA – 727-264/Adv, last operated by the Mexican Federal Police, is on display in Parque Tangamanga, San Luis Potosí City, Mexico.
 A nose section of a 727 is on static display at the Museum of Flying in Santa Monica, California; it was donated by FedEx after retirement, and underwent a complete restoration in the fall of 2018.
 A 727-2F is parked on an overflow ramp on Cargo Row between FedEx Ramp and DHL/UPS ramp at MCI (Kansas City International); it is used for airport fire services training and most pax carriers for de-ice training. It was donated by FedEx Express. 
 A 727-2F is used as a static platform trainer for Aircraft MX students at Tennessee College of Applied Sciences, Memphis International Airport (MEM). It is located on the east side of the airport near runway 9-27; it was donated by FedEx Express. 
 A 727-2F is used as a static platform for Aircraft MX and cockpit-procedure training by students at Middle Tennessee State University, Murfreesboro municipal airport (MBT- FAA and ICAO, no IATA identification).  Donated, it was flown from MEM by three of the most senior and experienced 727 FedEx flight crew members, making use of most of the 3,898-ft (1,188-m) runway.

Specifications

See also

Notes

References

External links

 
727 Datacenter | website dedicated to the history of the Boeing's trijet (http://727datacenter.net/)
Encyclopedia 727 | Book series with 5 volumes about the Boeing 727. Volume 1 already available (https://www.enciclopedia727.com.br/en)
727 prototype on rbogash.com
Boeing-727.com site
Fatal Boeing 727 Events on Airsafe.com
 
 
 

 
727
Trijets
1960s United States airliners
T-tail aircraft
Aircraft first flown in 1963
Low-wing aircraft